The CASA C-101 Aviojet is a low-wing single engine jet-powered advanced trainer and light attack aircraft designed and manufactured by Spanish aircraft company Construcciones Aeronáuticas SA (CASA).

The C-101 was developed in response to a Spanish Air Force requirement, which needed a replacement for the outdated Hispano Saeta. During 1975, CASA commenced work on what would become the C-101. In addition to its own design team, technical assistance was provided by Germany's Messerschmitt-Bölkow-Blohm (MBB) and the United States' Northrop. In June 1977, the first of four prototypes performed the type's maiden flight. The design was somewhat reminiscent of other jet trainers of the era, such as the BAE Hawk and the Alpha Jet, but was less aerodynamically sophisticated, being equipped with an unswept wing. Performance of the C-101 during flight testing was reported in excess of predictions.

On 17 March 1980, the first examples were introduced to operational service with the Spanish Air Force, which would be the principal customer for the C-101. The initial model possessed only a limited weapons capability, this attack capability was expanded upon later-built aircraft. Several models were exported to overseas operators; the C-101 has been adopted by the Chilean Air Force, Honduran Air Force and the Royal Jordanian Air Force. A final improved model, designated C-101DD, was demonstrated but did not find customers and thus it did not enter serial production. In addition to its use as a trainer aircraft, it has been used to perform aerobatics; in the latter context, it has been flown by the Patrulla Aguila aerobatics team. As of 2019, the C-101 remains in service in the Spanish Air Force and several other countries.

Early on the 2010s there were talks about the replacement of the C-101. Finally, in 2020 it was decided that the C-101 would be replaced by the Pilatus PC-21 (24) and the Airbus Future Jet Trainer(50 - 55).

Design and development

The C-101 was designed in response to a Spanish Air Force requirement issued in 1975, calling for a new jet trainer to replace its aging fleet of Hispano HA-200s and Ha.220s. Akin to the majority of contemporary European jet trainers, it was also to have a limited attack capability. During 1972, Hispano had been absorbed by Spanish aircraft company Construcciones Aeronáuticas SA (CASA), who took an interest in the trainer requirement. During October 1975, CASA was awarded a development contract based upon their submission, requiring a pair of static airframes and four flight-capable prototypes to be built for testing purposes at a cost of 1,297 million pesetas ($22 million).

To develop the aircraft, CASA sought technical assistance from overseas. Both the German manufacturing conglomerate Messerschmitt-Bölkow-Blohm (MBB) and American defense company Northrop opted to participate in the venture; specifically, engineers at MBB worked on the design of the rear fuselage and tail section while Northrop's team were responsible for the design of the aircraft's wings and engine inlets. Out of these efforts, a relatively conventional design was developed; according to aviation author John C. Fredriksen, the principles of simplicity and economy were highly emphasised by the design, shunning high performance features.

In terms of its basic configuration, the C-101 is a low-mounted monoplane, the wings were unswept. The cockpit, which was relatively spacious amongst its peers, accommodated a crew of two in a tandem seating; the seats were staggered to provide the instructor in the rear position with greater visibility. The fuselage provided considerable internal space, permitting the installation of various additional aviation or supplemental systems as to suit future requirements or other secondary roles. Foreseen secondary roles included ground attack, armed escort, photographic reconnaissance, and as an electronic countermeasures (ECM) platform.

The only surprising feature of the aircraft  was the presence of a large internal weapons bay located beneath the rear cockpit; this allowed for a wider variety of armament to be carried than the underwing hard points could accommodate; alternatively, this bay enabled the carriage of other equipment, including reconnaissance payloads. In addition to the weapons bay, both armaments and stores could be fitted upon six underwing hard points. The design was produced in a modular fashion, which eases both manufacture and maintenance activities. It was provisioned with a considerable endurance range as a result of the initial requirement having called for a self-deployment capability to the Canary Islands from the Spanish mainland.

The powerplant selected for the aircraft was the Honeywell TFE731-5-1J turbofan engine. This unit was actually a commercial engine that had been re-developed for military use. Even from an early stage of development, the TFE731 was viewed as a front runner for the aircraft. According to Fredriksen, it provided relatively favourable performance and a high level of fuel economy amongst its peers. Overall, the aircraft provided mainly favourable characteristics while remaining an affordable trainer in comparison to international competition.

Operational history
Although the first flight took place on 27 June 1977, the test flight phase, which included vibration, flutter and spin tests, did not commence until 17 April 1978. The prototype was flown in the Farnborough International Airshow during late July 1978. Performance was reportedly found to be better than anticipated by the designers. An initial order for 88 aircraft was placed by the Spanish Air Force; built as a dedicated trainer version, designated as C-101EB-01 by CASA and E.25 Mirlo ("Blackbird") by the air force. On 17 March 1980, the first aircraft entered service with the Spanish Air Force.

Shortly after this dedicated trainer model was introduced, the aircraft was followed in production by a combination attack/trainer variant. Equipped with an uprated engine, this variant was designated C-101BB-02. It was bought by numerous export customers, including Honduras, which bought four, and Chile, which bought four aircraft and parts for another eight to be assembled locally by ENAER. The Chilean BB-02s are designated T-36 Halcón.

In 1983, CASA flew a dedicated attack version, the C-101CC-02, which was again ordered by Chile. This time, only the prototype was built in Spain, with the remaining 22 machines built by ENAER. This variant featured yet another engine upgrade and increased fuel capacity; it has been designated A-36 Halcón ("Falcon").

Sixteen similar aircraft, the C-101CC-04 were sold to Jordan. During 2018, the last of these aircraft were phased out by the Royal Jordanian Air Force.

The final version of the C-101 to be developed, designated C-101DD, was first demonstrated by CASA during 1985. This model featured vastly improved avionics and featured systems such as a head-up display, HOTAS-cockpit, AN/ALR-66 radar warning receiver, chaff and flare countermeasures, as well as the capability to carry the AGM-65 Maverick air-to-ground missile; however, as of 2000 it had not attracted any orders.

Between 1990 and 1992, all Spanish Air Force C-101s received an extensive upgrade package which mainly focused on the aircraft's navigation and armament systems.

Operators

 Chilean Air Force (35 -12 C-101BB and 23 C-101CC).  Around 20 C-101CC still in service as A-36.

 Honduran Air Force (4 C-101BB)

 Royal Jordanian Air Force (16 C-101CC) – 

 Spanish Air and Space Force (88 C-101EB)

Specifications (CASA C-101CC)

See also

References

Citations

Bibliography

 
 Fredriksen, John C. International Warbirds: An Illustrated Guide to World Military Aircraft, 1914-2000. ABC-CLIO, 2001. .
 Hewson, Robert. "The Vital Guide to Military Aircraft." Airlife, 2001. .

External links

 EADS CASA Manufacturer specification
 Spanish Air Force specifications (Spanish)
 Aviojet, Zaragoza 31/05/2008

1980s Spanish attack aircraft
1970s Spanish military trainer aircraft
CASA aircraft
ENAER aircraft
Single-engined jet aircraft
Low-wing aircraft
Aircraft first flown in 1977
Chile–Spain relations